Drosera bulbosa, the red-leaved sundew, is a perennial tuberous species in the genus Drosera that is endemic to Western Australia. It grows in a rosette and produces white flowers emerge from April to June. D. bulbosa was first formally described by William Jackson Hooker in 1841.

See also 
List of Drosera species

References

External links 

Carnivorous plants of Australia
Caryophyllales of Australia
bulbosa
Eudicots of Western Australia
Plants described in 1841